392 is the second studio album and Japanese release by the South Korean rock band CNBlue. The album is the last indie release of the band in Japan, before the group move to Warner Music Japan. The album was released on September 1, 2011.

Composition
The album includes all songs released in the singles and 3 new songs: "Man in Front of the Mirror", "Coward" and "Illusion".

Singles
The album has 3 singles.
The first single of the album is "The Way". The single ranked number 26 on Oricon's Weekly chart with 3,353 copies sold in first week and sold more than 9,000 copies since then.

The second single is "I Don't Know Why". The single ranked number 15 on Oricon's Weekly chart with 8,134 copies sold in first week and sold more than 14,000 copies until now .

The third and last single (which is also their last indie single) is "Re-Maintenance". The single ranked number 14 on Oricon's Weekly chart with 3,897 copies sold in first week then climbed to number 12 in second week with 5,296 copies sold  and since then has sold more than 16,000 copies .

Track listing

Personnel
Credits adapted from the liner notes of 392.

CNBLUE
Jung Yong-hwa – vocals, harmony vocals, guitar, piano
Lee Jong-hyun – vocals, harmony vocals, guitar
Lee Jung-shin - bass guitar, harmony vocals
Kang Min-hyuk - drums, harmony vocals

Production
Choi Yoon-jung – producer
Chinone Yuji – mastering

Charts

Oricon

Year-end charts

References

2011 albums
CNBLUE albums